This is a list of the bird species recorded in China. The avifauna of China include a total of 1428 species, of which 57 are endemic, and 3 have been introduced by humans. Of these, 108 species are globally threatened.

This list's taxonomic treatment (designation and sequence of orders, families and species) and nomenclature (common and scientific names) follow the conventions of The Clements Checklist of Birds of the World, 2022 edition. The family accounts at the beginning of each heading reflect this taxonomy, as do the species counts found in each family account. Introduced and accidental species are included in the total counts for China.

The following tags have been used to highlight several categories. The commonly occurring native species do not fall into any of these categories.

 (A) Accidental - a species that rarely or accidentally occurs in China
 (E) Endemic - a species native or restricted to China
 (I) Introduced - a species introduced to China as a consequence, direct or indirect, of human actions
 (Ex) Extirpated - a species no longer found in China but found elsewhere

Ducks, geese, and waterfowl

Order: AnseriformesFamily: Anatidae

Anatidae includes the ducks and most duck-like waterfowl, such as geese and swans. These birds are adapted to an aquatic existence with webbed feet, flattened bills, and feathers that are excellent at shedding water due to an oily coating.

Lesser whistling-duck, Dendrocygna javanica
Bar-headed goose, Anser indicus
Snow goose, Anser caerulescens (A)
Graylag goose, Anser anser
Swan goose, Anser cygnoides
Greater white-fronted goose, Anser albifrons
Lesser white-fronted goose, Anser erythropus
Taiga bean-goose, Anser fabalis
Tundra bean-goose, Anser serrirostris
Brant, Branta bernicla
Barnacle goose, Branta leucopsis (A)
Cackling goose, Branta hutchinsii (A)
Canada goose, Branta canadensis(A)
Red-breasted goose, Branta ruficollis (A)
Mute swan, Cygnus olor
Tundra swan, Cygnus columbianus
Whooper swan, Cygnus cygnus
Knob-billed duck, Sarkidiornis melanotos
Ruddy shelduck, Tadorna ferruginea
Common shelduck, Tadorna tadorna
Cotton pygmy-goose, Nettapus coromandelianus
Mandarin duck, Aix galericulata
Baikal teal, Sibirionetta formosa
Garganey, Spatula querquedula
Northern shoveler, Spatula clypeata
Gadwall, Mareca strepera
Falcated duck, Mareca falcata
Eurasian wigeon, Mareca penelope
American wigeon, Mareca americana (A)
Indian spot-billed duck, Anas poecilorhyncha
Eastern spot-billed duck, Anas zonorhyncha
Mallard, Anas platyrhynchos
Northern pintail, Anas acuta
Green-winged teal, Anas crecca
Marbled teal, Marmaronetta angustirostris (A)
Red-crested pochard, Netta rufina
Canvasback, Aythya valisineria (A)
Common pochard, Aythya ferina
Ferruginous duck, Aythya nyroca
Baer's pochard, Aythya baeri
Tufted duck, Aythya fuligula
Greater scaup, Aythya marila
Steller's eider, Polysticta stelleri (A)
Harlequin duck, Histrionicus histrionicus
Velvet scoter, Melanitta fusca (A)
Stejneger's scoter, Melanitta stejnegeri
Black scoter, Melanitta americana (A)
Long-tailed duck, Clangula hyemalis
Common goldeneye, Bucephala clangula
Smew, Mergellus albellus
Common merganser, Mergus merganser
Red-breasted merganser, Mergus serrator
Scaly-sided merganser, Mergus squamatus
White-headed duck, Oxyura leucocephala

Pheasants, grouse, and allies 

Order: GalliformesFamily: Phasianidae

The Phasianidae are a family of terrestrial birds which consists of quails, partridges, snowcocks, francolins, spurfowls, tragopans, monals, pheasants, peafowls, grouse, ptarmigan, and jungle fowls. In general, they are plump (although they vary in size) and have broad, relatively short wings.

Hill partridge, Arborophila torqueola
Sichuan partridge, Arborophila rufipectus (E)
Chestnut-breasted partridge, Arborophila mandellii
White-necklaced partridge, Arborophila gingica (E)
Rufous-throated partridge, Arborophila rufogularis
Hainan partridge, Arborophila ardens (E)
White-cheeked partridge, Arborophila atrogularis
Bar-backed partridge, Arborophila brunneopectus
Snow partridge, Lerwa lerwa
Blood pheasant, Ithaginis cruentus
Western tragopan, Tragopan melanocephalus
Satyr tragopan, Tragopan satyra
Blyth's tragopan, Tragopan blythii
Temminck's tragopan, Tragopan temminckii
Cabot's tragopan, Tragopan caboti (E)
Verreaux's partridge, Tetraophasis obscurus (E)
Szecheny's partridge, Tetraophasis szechenyii
Himalayan monal, Lophophorus impejanus
Sclater's monal, Lophophorus sclateri
Chinese monal, Lophophorus lhuysii (E)
Koklass pheasant, Pucrasia macrolopha
Hazel grouse, Tetrastes bonasia
Severtzov's grouse, Tetrastes sewerzowi (E)
Willow ptarmigan, Lagopus lagopus
Rock ptarmigan, Lagopus muta
Siberian grouse, Falcipennis falcipennis
Black-billed capercaillie, Tetrao urogalloides
Western capercaillie, Tetrao urogallus
Black grouse, Lyrurus tetrix
Tibetan partridge, Perdix hodgsoniae
Gray partridge, Perdix perdix
Daurian partridge, Perdix dauurica
Reeves's pheasant, Syrmaticus reevesii (E)
Elliot's pheasant, Syrmaticus ellioti (E)
Hume's pheasant, Syrmaticus humiae
Golden pheasant, Chrysolophus pictus (E)
Lady Amherst's pheasant, Chrysolophus amherstiae
Ring-necked pheasant, Phasianus colchicus
Tibetan eared-pheasant, Crossoptilon harmani
White eared-pheasant, Crossoptilon crossoptilon (E)
Brown eared-pheasant, Crossoptilon mantchuricum (E)
Blue eared-pheasant, Crossoptilon auritum (E)
Kalij pheasant, Lophura leucomelanos
Silver pheasant, Lophura nycthemera
Green peafowl, Pavo muticus
Scaly-breasted partridge, Tropicoperdix chloropus
Hainan peacock-pheasant, Polyplectron katsumatae (E)
Gray peacock-pheasant, Polyplectron bicalcaratum
Mountain bamboo-partridge, Bambusicola fytchii
Chinese bamboo-partridge, Bambusicola thoracica
Red junglefowl, Gallus gallus
Chinese francolin, Francolinus pintadeanus
Tibetan snowcock, Tetraogallus tibetanus
Altai snowcock, Tetraogallus altaicus
Himalayan snowcock, Tetraogallus himalayensis
Blue-breasted quail, Synoicus chinensis
Common quail, Coturnix coturnix
Japanese quail, Coturnix japonica
Chukar, Alectoris chukar
Przevalski's partridge, Alectoris magna (E)

Flamingos
Order: PhoenicopteriformesFamily: Phoenicopteridae

Flamingos filter-feed on shellfish and algae. Their oddly shaped beaks are specially adapted to separate mud and silt from the food they consume and, uniquely, are used upside-down.

Greater flamingo, Phoenicopterus roseus (A)

Grebes
Order: PodicipediformesFamily: Podicipedidae

Grebes are small to medium-large freshwater diving birds. They have lobed toes and are excellent swimmers and divers. However, they have their feet placed far back on the body, making them quite ungainly on land.

Little grebe, Tachybaptus ruficollis
Horned grebe, Podiceps auritus
Red-necked grebe, Podiceps grisegena
Great crested grebe, Podiceps cristatus
Eared grebe, Podiceps nigricollis

Pigeons and doves
Order: ColumbiformesFamily: Columbidae

Pigeons and doves are stout-bodied birds with short necks and short slender bills with a fleshy cere.

Rock pigeon, Columba livia
Hill pigeon, Columba rupestris
Snow pigeon, Columba leuconota
Stock dove, Columba oenas
Yellow-eyed pigeon, Columba eversmanni
Common wood-pigeon, Columba palumbus
Speckled wood-pigeon, Columba hodgsonii
Ashy wood-pigeon, Columba pulchricollis
Pale-capped pigeon, Columba punicea (Ex?)
Japanese wood-pigeon, Columba janthina
European turtle-dove, Streptopelia turtur
Oriental turtle-dove, Streptopelia orientalis
Eurasian collared-dove, Streptopelia decaocto
Burmese collared-dove, Streptopelia xanthocycla
Red collared-dove, Streptopelia tranquebarica
Spotted dove, Streptopelia chinensis
Laughing dove, Streptopelia senegalensis
Barred cuckoo-dove, Macropygia unchall
Little cuckoo-dove, Macropygia ruficeps
Asian emerald dove, Chalcophaps indica
Orange-breasted green-pigeon, Treron bicincta
Ashy-headed green-pigeon, Treron phayrei
Thick-billed green-pigeon, Treron curvirostra
Yellow-footed green-pigeon, Treron phoenicoptera
Yellow-vented green-pigeon, Treron seimundi (A)
Pin-tailed green-pigeon, Treron apicauda
Wedge-tailed green-pigeon, Treron sphenura
White-bellied green-pigeon, Treron sieboldii
Whistling green-pigeon, Treron formosae
Black-chinned fruit-dove, Ptilinopus leclancheri
Green imperial-pigeon, Ducula aenea
Mountain imperial-pigeon, Ducula badia

Sandgrouse
Order: PterocliformesFamily: Pteroclidae

Sandgrouse have small, pigeon like heads and necks, but sturdy compact bodies. They have long pointed wings and sometimes tails and a fast direct flight. Flocks fly to watering holes at dawn and dusk. Their legs are feathered down to the toes.

Tibetan sandgrouse, Syrrhaptes tibetanus
Pallas's sandgrouse, Syrrhaptes paradoxus
Black-bellied sandgrouse, Pterocles orientalis

Bustards
Order: OtidiformesFamily: Otididae

Bustards are large terrestrial birds mainly associated with dry open country and steppes in the Old World. They are omnivorous and nest on the ground. They walk steadily on strong legs and big toes, pecking for food as they go. They have long broad wings with "fingered" wingtips and striking patterns in flight. Many have interesting mating displays.

Great bustard, Otis tarda
Macqueen's bustard, Chlamydotis macqueenii
Little bustard, Tetrax tetrax

Cuckoos

Order: CuculiformesFamily: Cuculidae

The family Cuculidae includes cuckoos, roadrunners and anis. These birds are of variable size with slender bodies, long tails and strong legs.

Greater coucal, Centropus sinensis
Lesser coucal, Centropus bengalensis
Green-billed malkoha, Phaenicophaeus tristis
Chestnut-winged cuckoo, Clamator coromandus
Pied cuckoo, Clamator jacobinus
Asian koel, Eudynamys scolopacea
Asian emerald cuckoo, Chrysococcyx maculatus
Violet cuckoo, Chrysococcyx xanthorhynchus
Banded bay cuckoo, Cacomantis sonneratii
Plaintive cuckoo, Cacomantis merulinus
Fork-tailed drongo-cuckoo, Surniculus dicruroides
Square-tailed drongo-cuckoo, Surniculus lugubris
Large hawk-cuckoo, Hierococcyx sparverioides
Northern hawk-cuckoo, Hierococcyx hyperythrus
Hodgson's hawk-cuckoo, Hierococcyx nisicolor
Lesser cuckoo, Cuculus poliocephalus
Indian cuckoo, Cuculus micropterus
Himalayan cuckoo, Cuculus saturatus
Common cuckoo, Cuculus canorus
Oriental cuckoo, Cuculus optatus

Frogmouths
Order: CaprimulgiformesFamily: Podargidae

The frogmouths are a group of nocturnal birds related to the nightjars. They are named for their large flattened hooked bill and huge frog-like gape, which they use to take insects.

Hodgson's frogmouth, Batrachostomus hodgsoni

Nightjars and allies
Order: CaprimulgiformesFamily: Caprimulgidae

Nightjars are medium-sized nocturnal birds that usually nest on the ground. They have long wings, short legs and very short bills. Most have small feet, of little use for walking, and long pointed wings. Their soft plumage is camouflaged to resemble bark or leaves.

Great eared-nightjar, Eurostopodus macrotis
Gray nightjar, Caprimulgus jotaka
Eurasian nightjar, Caprimulgus europaeus
Egyptian nightjar, Caprimulgus aegyptius
Large-tailed nightjar, Caprimulgus macrurus
Savanna nightjar, Caprimulgus affinis

Swifts
Order: CaprimulgiformesFamily: Apodidae

Swifts are small birds which spend the majority of their lives flying. These birds have very short legs and never settle voluntarily on the ground, perching instead only on vertical surfaces. Many swifts have long swept-back wings which resemble a crescent or boomerang.

White-throated needletail, Hirundapus caudacutus
Silver-backed needletail, Hirundapus cochinchinensis
Brown-backed needletail, Hirundapus giganteus (A)
Himalayan swiftlet, Aerodramus brevirostris
Black-nest swiftlet, Aerodramus maximus
White-nest swiftlet, Aerodramus fuciphagus
Germain's swiftlet, Aerodramus germani
Alpine swift, Apus melba (A)
Common swift, Apus apus
Pacific swift, Apus pacificus
Salim Ali's swift, Apus salimalii (E)
Blyth's swift, Apus leuconyx
Cook's swift, Apus cooki
Dark-rumped swift, Apus acuticauda (A)
House swift, Apus nipalensis
Asian palm-swift, Cypsiurus balasiensis

Treeswifts
Order: CaprimulgiformesFamily: Hemiprocnidae

The treeswifts, also called crested swifts, are closely related to the true swifts. They differ from the other swifts in that they have crests, long forked tails and softer plumage.

Crested treeswift, Hemiprocne coronata

Rails, gallinules, and coots
Order: GruiformesFamily: Rallidae

Rallidae is a large family of small to medium-sized birds which includes the rails, crakes, coots and gallinules. Typically they inhabit dense vegetation in damp environments near lakes, swamps or rivers. In general they are shy and secretive birds, making them difficult to observe. Most species have strong legs and long toes which are well adapted to soft uneven surfaces. They tend to have short, rounded wings and to be weak fliers.

Water rail, Rallus aquaticus
Brown-cheeked rail, Rallus indicus
Corn crake, Crex crex
Slaty-breasted rail, Lewinia striata
Spotted crake, Porzana porzana
Eurasian moorhen, Gallinula chloropus
Eurasian coot, Fulica atra
Grey-headed swamphen, Porphyrio poliocephalus
White-browed crake, Poliolimnas cinereus (A)
Watercock, Gallicrex cinerea
White-breasted waterhen, Amaurornis phoenicurus
Red-legged crake, Rallina fasciata (A)
Slaty-legged crake, Rallina eurizonoides
Ruddy-breasted crake, Zapornia fusca
Band-bellied crake, Zapornia paykullii
Brown crake, Zapornia akool
Little crake, Zapornia parva
Baillon's crake, Zapornia pusilla
Black-tailed crake, Zapornia bicolor
Swinhoe's rail, Coturnicops exquisitus

Cranes
Order: GruiformesFamily: Gruidae

Cranes are large, long-legged and long-necked birds. Unlike the similar-looking but unrelated herons, cranes fly with necks outstretched, not pulled back. Most have elaborate and noisy courting displays or "dances". China has the greatest diversity of cranes of any country.

Demoiselle crane, Anthropoides virgo
Siberian crane, Leucogeranus leucogeranus
Sandhill crane, Antigone canadensis (A)
Sarus crane,  Antigone antigone
White-naped crane, Antigone vipio
Common crane, Grus grus
Hooded crane, Grus monacha
Black-necked crane, Grus nigricollis
Red-crowned crane, Grus japonensis

Thick-knees
Order: CharadriiformesFamily: Burhinidae

The thick-knees are a group of largely tropical waders in the family Burhinidae. They are found worldwide within the tropical zone, with some species also breeding in temperate Europe and Australia. They are medium to large waders with strong black or yellow-black bills, large yellow eyes and cryptic plumage. Despite being classed as waders, most species have a preference for arid or semi-arid habitats.

Eurasian thick-knee, Burhinus oedicnemus
Great thick-knee, Esacus recurvirostris
Beach thick-knee, Esacus magnirostris (A)

Avocets and stilts
Order: CharadriiformesFamily: Recurvirostridae

Recurvirostridae is a family of large wading birds, which includes the avocets and stilts. The avocets have long legs and long up-curved bills. The stilts have extremely long legs and long, thin, straight bills.

Black-winged stilt, Himantopus himantopus
Pied avocet, Recurvirostra avosetta

Ibisbill
Order: CharadriiformesFamily: Ibidorhynchidae

The ibisbill is related to the waders, but is sufficiently distinctive to be a family unto itself. The adult is gray with a white belly, red legs, a long down curved bill, and a black face and breast band.

Ibisbill, Ibidorhyncha struthersii

Oystercatchers
Order: CharadriiformesFamily: Haematopodidae

The oystercatchers are large and noisy plover-like birds, with strong bills used for smashing or prising open molluscs.

Eurasian oystercatcher, Haematopus ostralegus

Plovers and lapwings
Order: CharadriiformesFamily: Charadriidae

The family Charadriidae includes the plovers, dotterels and lapwings. They are small to medium-sized birds with compact bodies, short, thick necks and long, usually pointed, wings. They are found in open country worldwide, mostly in habitats near water.

Black-bellied plover, Pluvialis squatarola
European golden-plover, Pluvialis apricaria (A)
Pacific golden-plover, Pluvialis fulva
Northern lapwing, Vanellus vanellus
River lapwing, Vanellus duvaucelii
Gray-headed lapwing, Vanellus cinereus
Red-wattled lapwing, Vanellus indicus
Sociable lapwing, Vanellus gregarius (A) (Ex?)
White-tailed lapwing, Vanellus leucurus (A)
Lesser sand-plover, Charadrius mongolus
Greater sand-plover, Charadrius leschenaultii
Caspian plover, Charadrius asiaticus
Kentish plover, Charadrius alexandrinus
White-faced plover, Charadrius dealbatus
Common ringed plover, Charadrius hiaticula 
Semipalmated plover, Charadrius semipalmatus
Long-billed plover, Charadrius placidus
Little ringed plover, Charadrius dubius
Oriental plover, Charadrius veredus
Eurasian dotterel, Charadrius morinellus

Painted-snipes
Order: CharadriiformesFamily: Rostratulidae

Painted-snipes are short-legged, long-billed birds similar in shape to the true snipes, but more brightly colored.

Greater painted-snipe, Rostratula benghalensis

Jacanas
Order: CharadriiformesFamily: Jacanidae

The jacanas are a group of tropical waders in the family Jacanidae. They are found throughout the tropics. They are identifiable by their huge feet and claws which enable them to walk on floating vegetation in the shallow lakes that are their preferred habitat.

Pheasant-tailed jacana, Hydrophasianus chirurgus
Bronze-winged jacana, Metopidius indicus (A)

Sandpipers and allies
Order: CharadriiformesFamily: Scolopacidae

Scolopacidae is a large diverse family of small to medium-sized shorebirds including the sandpipers, curlews, godwits, shanks, tattlers, woodcocks, snipes, dowitchers and phalaropes. The majority of these species eat small invertebrates picked out of the mud or soil. Variation in length of legs and bills enables multiple species to feed in the same habitat, particularly on the coast, without direct competition for food.

Whimbrel, Numenius phaeopus
Little curlew, Numenius minutus
Far Eastern curlew, Numenius madagascariensis
Eurasian curlew, Numenius arquata
Bar-tailed godwit, Limosa lapponica
Black-tailed godwit, Limosa limosa
Ruddy turnstone, Arenaria interpres
Great knot, Calidris tenuirostris
Red knot, Calidris canutus
Ruff, Calidris pugnax
Broad-billed sandpiper, Calidris falcinellus
Sharp-tailed sandpiper, Calidris acuminata
Curlew sandpiper, Calidris ferruginea
Temminck's stint, Calidris temminckii
Long-toed stint, Calidris subminuta
Spoon-billed sandpiper, Calidris pygmeus
Red-necked stint, Calidris ruficollis
Sanderling, Calidris alba
Dunlin, Calidris alpina
Rock sandpiper, Calidris ptilocnemis (A)
Baird's sandpiper, Calidris bairdii (A)
Little stint, Calidris minuta
White-rumped sandpiper, Calidris fuscicollis (A)
Pectoral sandpiper, Calidris melanotos (A)
Western sandpiper, Calidris mauri (A)
Asian dowitcher, Limnodromus semipalmatus
Long-billed dowitcher, Limnodromus scolopaceus (A)
Jack snipe, Lymnocryptes minimus
Eurasian woodcock, Scolopax rusticola
Solitary snipe, Gallinago solitaria
Latham's snipe, Gallinago hardwickii (A)
Wood snipe, Gallinago nemoricola
Common snipe, Gallinago gallinago
Pin-tailed snipe, Gallinago stenura
Swinhoe's snipe, Gallinago megala
Terek sandpiper, Xenus cinereus
Red-necked phalarope, Phalaropus lobatus
Red phalarope, Phalaropus fulicarius (A)
Common sandpiper, Actitis hypoleucos
Green sandpiper, Tringa ochropus
Gray-tailed tattler, Tringa brevipes
Spotted redshank, Tringa erythropus
Common greenshank, Tringa nebularia
Nordmann's greenshank, Tringa guttifer
Marsh sandpiper, Tringa stagnatilis
Wood sandpiper, Tringa glareola
Common redshank, Tringa totanus

Buttonquail
Order: CharadriiformesFamily: Turnicidae

The buttonquail are small, drab, running birds which resemble the true quails. The female is the brighter of the sexes and initiates courtship. The male incubates the eggs and tends the young. 
Small buttonquail, Turnix sylvatica
Yellow-legged buttonquail, Turnix tanki
Barred buttonquail, Turnix suscitator

Pratincoles and coursers
Order: CharadriiformesFamily: Glareolidae

Glareolidae is a family of wading birds comprising the pratincoles, which have short legs, long pointed wings and long forked tails, and the coursers, which have long legs, short wings and long, pointed bills which curve downwards.

Collared pratincole, Glareola pratincola
Oriental pratincole, Glareola maldivarum
Black-winged pratincole, Glareola nordmanni (A)
Small pratincole, Glareola lactea

Skuas and jaegers
Order: CharadriiformesFamily: Stercorariidae

The family Stercorariidae are, in general, medium to large birds, typically with gray or brown plumage, often with white markings on the wings. They nest on the ground in temperate and arctic regions and are long-distance migrants.

South polar skua, Stercorarius maccormicki (A)
Pomarine jaeger, Stercorarius pomarinus (A)
Parasitic jaeger, Stercorarius parasiticus
Long-tailed jaeger, Stercorarius longicaudus (A)

Auks, murres and puffins
Order: CharadriiformesFamily: Alcidae

Alcids are superficially similar to penguins due to their black-and-white colors, their upright posture and some of their habits, however they are not related to the penguins and differ in being able to fly. Auks live on the open sea, only deliberately coming ashore to nest.

Long-billed murrelet, Brachyramphus perdix
Ancient murrelet, Synthliboramphus antiquus
Japanese murrelet, Synthliboramphus wumizusume
Rhinoceros auklet, Cerorhinca monocerata

Gulls, terns, and skimmers
Order: CharadriiformesFamily: Laridae

Laridae is a family of medium to large seabirds, the gulls, terns and skimmers. Gulls are typically gray or white, often with black markings on the head or wings. They have stout, longish bills and webbed feet. Terns are a group of generally medium to large seabirds typically with gray or white plumage, often with black markings on the head. Most terns hunt fish by diving but some pick insects off the surface of fresh water. Terns are generally long-lived birds, with several species known to live in excess of 30 years. Skimmers are a small family of tropical tern-like birds. They have an elongated lower mandible which they use to feed by flying low over the water surface and skimming the water for small fish.

Black-legged kittiwake, Rissa tridactyla
Saunders's gull, Saundersilarus saundersi
Slender-billed gull, Chroicocephalus genei
Silver gull, Chroicocephalus novaehollandiae (A)
Black-headed gull, Chroicocephalus ridibundus
Brown-headed gull, Chroicocephalus brunnicephalus
Little gull, Hydrocoloeus minutus 
Ross's gull, Rhodostethia rosea (A)
Franklin's gull, Leucophaeus pipixcan (A)
Relict gull, Ichthyaetus relictus
Pallas's gull, Ichthyaetus ichthyaetus
Black-tailed gull, Larus crassirostris
Common gull, Larus canus
Herring gull, Larus argentatus
Caspian gull, Larus cachinnans
Lesser black-backed gull, Larus fuscus
Slaty-backed gull, Larus schistisagus 
Glaucous-winged gull, Larus glaucescens (A)
Glaucous gull, Larus hyperboreus
Brown noddy, Anous stolidus
White tern, Gygis alba
Sooty tern, Onychoprion fuscatus
Bridled tern, Onychoprion anaethetus
Aleutian tern, Onychoprion aleuticus (A)
Little tern, Sternula albifrons
Gull-billed tern, Gelochelidon nilotica
Caspian tern, Hydroprogne caspia
Black tern, Chlidonias niger
White-winged tern, Chlidonias leucopterus
Whiskered tern, Chlidonias hybrida
Roseate tern, Sterna dougallii
Black-naped tern, Sterna sumatrana
Common tern, Sterna hirundo
Black-bellied tern, Sterna acuticauda
River tern, Sterna aurantia
Great crested tern, Thalasseus bergii
Sandwich tern, Thalasseus sandvicensis (A)
Lesser crested tern, Thalasseus bengalensis (A)
Chinese crested tern, Thalasseus bernsteini

Tropicbirds
Order: PhaethontiformesFamily: Phaethontidae

Tropicbirds are slender white birds of tropical oceans, with exceptionally long central tail feathers. Their heads and long wings have black markings.

White-tailed tropicbird, Phaethon lepturus
Red-billed tropicbird, Phaethon aethereus
Red-tailed tropicbird, Phaethon rubricauda

Loons
Order: GaviiformesFamily: Gaviidae

Loons, known as divers in Europe, are a group of aquatic birds found in many parts of North America and northern Europe. They are the size of a large duck or small goose, which they somewhat resemble when swimming, but to which they are completely unrelated.

Red-throated loon, Gavia stellata
Arctic loon, Gavia arctica
Pacific loon, Gavia pacifica
Yellow-billed loon, Gavia adamsii (A)

Albatrosses
Order: ProcellariiformesFamily: Diomedeidae

The albatrosses are among the largest of flying birds, and the great albatrosses from the genus Diomedea have the largest wingspans of any extant birds.

Black-footed albatross, Phoebastria nigripes
Short-tailed albatross, Phoebastria albatrus (A)

Southern storm-petrels
Order: ProcellariiformesFamily: Oceanitidae

The southern storm-petrels are relatives of the petrels and are the smallest seabirds. They feed on planktonic crustaceans and small fish picked from the surface, typically while hovering.

Wilson's storm-petrel, Oceanites oceanicus (A)

Northern storm-petrels
Order: ProcellariiformesFamily: Hydrobatidae

The northern storm-petrels are relatives of the petrels and are the smallest seabirds. They feed on planktonic crustaceans and small fish picked from the surface, typically while hovering. The flight is fluttering and sometimes bat-like.

Leach's storm-petrel, Hydrobates leucorhous (A)
Swinhoe's storm-petrel, Hydrobates monorhis

Shearwaters and petrels

Order: ProcellariiformesFamily: Procellariidae

The procellariids are the main group of medium-sized "true petrels", characterized by united nostrils with medium septum and a long outer functional primary.

Northern fulmar, Fulmarus glacialis (A)
Bonin petrel, Pterodroma hypoleuca
Bulwer's petrel, Bulweria bulwerii
Tahiti petrel, Pseudobulweria rostrata
Streaked shearwater, Calonectris leucomelas
Wedge-tailed shearwater, Ardenna pacifica
Sooty shearwater, Ardenna grisea
Short-tailed shearwater, Ardenna tenuirostris (A)

Storks

Order: CiconiiformesFamily: Ciconiidae

Storks are large, long-legged, long-necked, wading birds with long, stout bills. Storks are mute, but bill-clattering is an important mode of communication at the nest. Their nests can be large and may be reused for many years. Many species are migratory.

Asian openbill, Anastomus oscitans
Black stork, Ciconia nigra
Asian woolly-necked stork, Ciconia episcopus
White stork, Ciconia ciconia (A)
Oriental stork, Ciconia boyciana
Lesser adjutant, Leptoptilos javanicus
Painted stork, Mycteria leucocephala

Frigatebirds
Order: SuliformesFamily: Fregatidae

Frigatebirds are large seabirds usually found over tropical oceans. They are large, black-and-white or completely black, with long wings and deeply forked tails. The males have colored inflatable throat pouches. They do not swim or walk and cannot take off from a flat surface. Having the largest wingspan-to-body-weight ratio of any bird, they are essentially aerial, able to stay aloft for more than a week.

Lesser frigatebird, Fregata ariel (A)
Christmas Island frigatebird, Fregata andrewsi (A)
Great frigatebird, Fregata minor

Boobies and gannets
Order: SuliformesFamily: Sulidae

The sulids comprise the gannets and boobies. Both groups are medium to large coastal seabirds that plunge-dive for fish.

Masked booby, Sula dactylatra
Brown booby, Sula leucogaster
Red-footed booby, Sula sula

Cormorants and shags
Order: SuliformesFamily: Phalacrocoracidae

Phalacrocoracidae is a family of medium to large coastal, fish-eating seabirds that includes cormorants and shags. Plumage coloration varies, with the majority having mainly dark plumage, some species being black-and-white and a few being colorful.

Little cormorant, Microcarbo niger
Pygmy cormorant, Microcarbo pygmaeus (A)
Red-faced cormorant, Urile urile (A)
Pelagic cormorant, Urile pelagicus
Great cormorant, Phalacrocorax carbo
Japanese cormorant, Phalacrocorax capillatus

Pelicans
Order: PelecaniformesFamily: Pelecanidae

Pelicans are large water birds with a distinctive pouch under their beak. As with other members of the order Pelecaniformes, they have webbed feet with four toes.

Great white pelican, Pelecanus onocrotalus
Spot-billed pelican, Pelecanus philippensis
Dalmatian pelican, Pelecanus crispus

Herons, egrets, and bitterns

Order: PelecaniformesFamily: Ardeidae

The family Ardeidae contains the bitterns, herons and egrets. Herons and egrets are medium to large wading birds with long necks and legs. Bitterns tend to be shorter necked and more wary. Members of Ardeidae fly with their necks retracted, unlike other long-necked birds such as storks, ibises and spoonbills.

Great bittern, Botaurus stellaris
Yellow bittern, Ixobrychus sinensis
Little bittern, Ixobrychus minutus
Schrenck's bittern, Ixobrychus eurhythmus
Cinnamon bittern, Ixobrychus cinnamomeus
Black bittern, Ixobrychus flavicollis
Gray heron, Ardea cinerea
White-bellied heron, Ardea insignis
Great-billed heron, Ardea sumatrana
Purple heron, Ardea purpurea
Great egret, Ardea alba
Intermediate egret, Ardea intermedia
White-faced heron, Egretta novaehollandiae (A)
Chinese egret, Egretta eulophotes
Little egret, Egretta garzetta
Pacific reef-heron, Egretta sacra
Pied heron, Egretta picata (A)
Cattle egret, Bubulcus ibis
Indian pond-heron, Ardeola grayii (A)
Chinese pond-heron, Ardeola bacchus
Striated heron, Butorides striata
Black-crowned night-heron, Nycticorax nycticorax
White-eared night-heron, Gorsachius magnificus
Japanese night-heron, Gorsachius goisagi
Malayan night-heron, Gorsachius melanolophus

Ibises and spoonbills
Order: PelecaniformesFamily: Threskiornithidae

Threskiornithidae is a family of large terrestrial and wading birds which includes the ibises and spoonbills. They have long, broad wings with 11 primary and about 20 secondary feathers. They are strong fliers and despite their size and weight, very capable soarers.

Glossy ibis, Plegadis falcinellus
Black-headed ibis, Threskiornis melanocephalus
White-shouldered ibis, Pseudibis davisoni (Ex?)
Crested ibis, Nipponia nippon
Eurasian spoonbill, Platalea leucorodia
Black-faced spoonbill, Platalea minor

Osprey
Order: AccipitriformesFamily: Pandionidae

The family Pandionidae contains only one species, the osprey. The osprey is a medium-large raptor which is a specialist fish-eater with a worldwide distribution.

Osprey, Pandion haliaetus

Hawks, eagles, and kites
Order: AccipitriformesFamily: Accipitridae

Accipitridae is a family of birds of prey, which includes hawks, eagles, kites, harriers and Old World vultures. These birds have powerful hooked beaks for tearing flesh from their prey, strong legs, powerful talons and keen eyesight.

Black-winged kite, Elanus caeruleus
Bearded vulture, Gypaetus barbatus
Egyptian vulture, Neophron percnopterus (A)
Oriental honey-buzzard, Pernis ptilorhynchus
Jerdon's baza, Aviceda jerdoni
Black baza, Aviceda leuphotes
Red-headed vulture, Sarcogyps calvus 
Cinereous vulture, Aegypius monachus
White-rumped vulture, Gyps bengalensis (Ex)
Himalayan griffon, Gyps himalayensis
Eurasian griffon, Gyps fulvus (A)
Crested serpent-eagle, Spilornis cheela
Short-toed snake-eagle, Circaetus gallicus
Mountain hawk-eagle, Nisaetus nipalensis
Rufous-bellied eagle, Lophotriorchis kienerii
Black eagle, Ictinaetus malaiensis
Greater spotted eagle, Clanga clanga
Booted eagle, Hieraaetus pennatus
Steppe eagle, Aquila nipalensis
Imperial eagle, Aquila heliaca
Golden eagle, Aquila chrysaetos
Bonelli's eagle, Aquila fasciata
White-eyed buzzard, Butastur teesa
Rufous-winged buzzard, Butastur liventer
Gray-faced buzzard, Butastur indicus
Eurasian marsh harrier, Circus aeruginosus
Eastern marsh harrier, Circus spilonotus
Hen harrier, Circus cyaneus
Pallid harrier, Circus macrourus
Pied harrier, Circus melanoleucos
Montagu's harrier, Circus pygargus
Crested goshawk, Accipiter trivirgatus
Shikra, Accipiter badius
Chinese sparrowhawk, Accipiter soloensis
Japanese sparrowhawk, Accipiter gularis
Besra, Accipiter virgatus
Eurasian sparrowhawk, Accipiter nisus
Northern goshawk, Accipiter gentilis
Black kite, Milvus migrans
Brahminy kite, Haliastur indus
White-tailed eagle, Haliaeetus albicilla
Pallas's fish eagle, Haliaeetus leucoryphus
Steller's sea eagle, Haliaeetus pelagicus (A)
White-bellied sea eagle, Haliaeetus leucogaster
Lesser fish eagle, Ichthyophaga humilis (A)
Rough-legged hawk, Buteo lagopus
Common buzzard, Buteo buteo
Himalayan buzzard, Buteo burmanicus
Eastern buzzard, Buteo japonicus
Long-legged buzzard, Buteo rufinus
Upland buzzard, Buteo hemilasius

Barn-owls
Order: StrigiformesFamily: Tytonidae

Barn owls are medium to large owls with large heads and characteristic heart-shaped faces. They have long strong legs with powerful talons.

Australasian grass-owl, Tyto longimembris
Barn owl, Tyto alba
Oriental bay-owl, Phodilus badius

Owls
Order: StrigiformesFamily: Strigidae

The typical owls are small to large solitary nocturnal birds of prey. They have large forward-facing eyes and ears, a hawk-like beak and a conspicuous circle of feathers around each eye called a facial disk.

Mountain scops-owl, Otus spilocephalus
Collared scops-owl, Otus lettia
Japanese scops-owl, Otus semitorques
Eurasian scops-owl, Otus scops
Pallid scops-owl, Otus brucei
Oriental scops-owl, Otus sunia
Eurasian eagle-owl, Bubo bubo
Spot-bellied eagle-owl, Bubo nipalensis
Dusky eagle-owl, Bubo coromandus (A)
Snowy owl, Bubo scandiacus
Blakiston's fish-owl, Ketupa blakistoni
Brown fish-owl, Ketupa zeylonensis
Tawny fish-owl, Ketupa flavipes
Northern hawk owl, Surnia ulula
Eurasian pygmy-owl, Glaucidium passerinum
Asian barred owlet, Glaucidium cuculoides
Collared owlet, Taenioptynx brodiei
Spotted owlet, Athene brama
Little owl, Athene noctua
Brown wood-owl, Strix leptogrammica
Tawny owl, Strix aluco
Himalayan owl, Strix nivicolum
Ural owl, Strix uralensis
Great gray owl, Strix nebulosa
Long-eared owl, Asio otus
Short-eared owl, Asio flammeus
Boreal owl, Aegolius funereus
Brown boobook, Ninox scutulata
Northern boobook, Ninox japonica

Trogons
Order: TrogoniformesFamily: Trogonidae

The family Trogonidae includes trogons and quetzals. Found in tropical woodlands worldwide, they feed on insects and fruit, and their broad bills and weak legs reflect their diet and arboreal habits. Although their flight is fast, they are reluctant to fly any distance. Trogons have soft, often colorful, feathers with distinctive male and female plumage.

Red-headed trogon, Harpactes erythrocephalus
Orange-breasted trogon, Harpactes oreskios
Ward's trogon, Harpactes wardi

Hoopoes
Order: BucerotiformesFamily: Upupidae

Hoopoes have black, white and orangey-pink coloring with a long crest on their head, the plumage of which sweeps backward at rest but can be flexed to an erect position.

Eurasian hoopoe, Upupa epops

Hornbills
Order: BucerotiformesFamily: Bucerotidae

Hornbills are a group of birds whose bill is shaped like a cow's horn, but without a twist, sometimes with a casque on the upper mandible. Frequently, the bill is brightly colored.

Great hornbill, Buceros bicornis
Brown hornbill, Anorrhinus austeni
Oriental pied-hornbill, Anthracoceros albirostris
Rufous-necked hornbill, Aceros nipalensis
Wreathed hornbill, Rhyticeros undulatus

Kingfishers
Order: CoraciiformesFamily: Alcedinidae

Kingfishers are medium-sized birds with large heads, long, pointed bills, short legs and stubby tails.

Blyth's kingfisher, Alcedo hercules
Common kingfisher, Alcedo atthis
Blue-eared kingfisher, Alcedo meninting
Black-backed dwarf-kingfisher, Ceyx erithacus
Stork-billed kingfisher, Pelargopsis capensis
Ruddy kingfisher, Halcyon coromanda
White-throated kingfisher, Halcyon smyrnensis
Black-capped kingfisher, Halcyon pileata
Collared kingfisher, Todirhamphus chloris
Crested kingfisher, Megaceryle lugubris
Pied kingfisher, Ceryle rudis

Bee-eaters
Order: CoraciiformesFamily: Meropidae

The bee-eaters are a group of near passerine birds in the family Meropidae. Most species are found in Africa but others occur in southern Europe, Madagascar, Australia and New Guinea. They are characterized by richly colored plumage, slender bodies and usually elongated central tail feathers. All are colorful and have long downturned bills and pointed wings, which give them a swallow-like appearance when seen from afar.

Blue-bearded bee-eater, Nyctyornis athertoni
Asian green bee-eater, Merops orientalis
Blue-throated bee-eater, Merops viridis
Blue-cheeked bee-eater, Merops persicus (A)
Blue-tailed bee-eater, Merops philippinus
European bee-eater, Merops apiaster
Chestnut-headed bee-eater, Merops leschenaulti

Rollers
Order: CoraciiformesFamily: Coraciidae

Rollers resemble crows in size and build, but are more closely related to the kingfishers and bee-eaters. They share the colorful appearance of those groups with blues and browns predominating. The two inner front toes are connected, but the outer toe is not.

European roller, Coracias garrulus
Indian roller, Coracias benghalensis (A)
Indochinese roller, Coracias affinis
Dollarbird, Eurystomus orientalis

Asian barbets
Order: PiciformesFamily: Megalaimidae

The Asian barbets are plump birds, with short necks and large heads. They get their name from the bristles which fringe their heavy bills. Most species are brightly colored.

Coppersmith barbet, Psilopogon haemacephalus
Blue-eared barbet, Psilopogon duvaucelii
Great barbet, Psilopogon virens
Green-eared barbet, Psilopogon faiostrictus
Lineated barbet, Psilopogon lineatus
Golden-throated barbet, Psilopogon franklinii
Chinese barbet, Psilopogon faber (E)
Blue-throated barbet, Psilopogon asiaticus

Honeyguides
Order: PiciformesFamily: Indicatoridae

Honeyguides are among the few birds that feed on wax. They are named for the greater honeyguide which leads traditional honey-hunters to bees' nests and, after the hunters have harvested the honey, feeds on the remaining contents of the hive.

Yellow-rumped honeyguide, Indicator xanthonotus

Woodpeckers
Order: PiciformesFamily: Picidae

Woodpeckers are small to medium-sized birds with chisel-like beaks, short legs, stiff tails and long tongues used for capturing insects. Some species have feet with two toes pointing forward and two backward, while several species have only three toes. Many woodpeckers have the habit of tapping noisily on tree trunks with their beaks.

Eurasian wryneck, Jynx torquilla
Speckled piculet, Picumnus innominatus
White-browed piculet, Sasia ochracea
Eurasian three-toed woodpecker, Picoides tridactylus
Gray-capped pygmy woodpecker, Yungipicus canicapillus
Japanese pygmy woodpecker, Yungipicus kizuki
Yellow-crowned woodpecker, Leiopicus mahrattensis
Brown-fronted woodpecker, Dendrocoptes auriceps (A)
Rufous-bellied woodpecker, Dendrocopos hyperythrus
Fulvous-breasted woodpecker, Dendrocopos macei (A)
Stripe-breasted woodpecker, Dendrocopos atratus
White-backed woodpecker, Dendrocopos leucotos
Darjeeling woodpecker, Dendrocopos darjellensis
Great spotted woodpecker, Dendrocopos major
White-winged woodpecker, Dendrocopos leucopterus
Lesser spotted woodpecker, Dryobates minor
Crimson-breasted woodpecker, Dryobates cathpharius
Bay woodpecker, Blythipicus pyrrhotis
Greater flameback, Chrysocolaptes guttacristatus
Rufous woodpecker, Micropternus brachyurus
Pale-headed woodpecker, Gecinulus grantia
Common flameback, Dinopium javanense
Lesser yellownape, Picus chlorolophus
Streak-throated woodpecker, Picus xanthopygaeus
Scaly-bellied woodpecker, Picus squamatus
Red-collared woodpecker, Picus rabieri (A)
Laced woodpecker, Picus vittatus
Gray-headed woodpecker, Picus canus
Greater yellownape, Chrysophlegma flavinucha
Great slaty woodpecker, Mulleripicus pulverulentus
White-bellied woodpecker, Dryocopus javensis
Black woodpecker, Dryocopus martius

Falcons and caracaras
Order: FalconiformesFamily: Falconidae

Falconidae is a family of diurnal birds of prey. They differ from hawks, eagles and kites in that they kill with their beaks instead of their talons.

Collared falconet, Microhierax caerulescens
Pied falconet, Microhierax melanoleucus
Lesser kestrel, Falco naumanni
Eurasian kestrel, Falco tinnunculus
Red-footed falcon, Falco vespertinus
Amur falcon, Falco amurensis
Merlin, Falco columbarius
Eurasian hobby, Falco subbuteo
Oriental hobby, Falco severus
Saker falcon, Falco cherrug
Gyrfalcon, Falco rusticolus (A)
Peregrine falcon, Falco peregrinus
Barbary falcon, Falco peregrinus pelegrinoides

Old world parrots
Order: PsittaciformesFamily: Psittaculidae

Characteristic features of parrots include a strong curved bill, an upright stance, strong legs, and clawed zygodactyl feet. Many parrots are vividly colored, and some are multi-colored. Old World parrots are found from Africa east across south and southeast Asia and Oceania to Australia and New Zealand.
 
Blue-rumped parrot, Psittinus cyanurus (A)
Alexandrine parakeet, Psittacula eupatria
Rose-ringed parakeet, Psittacula krameri (I)
Slaty-headed parakeet, Psittacula himalayana
Gray-headed parakeet, Psittacula finschii
Plum-headed parakeet, Psittacula cyanocephala
Blossom-headed parakeet, Psittacula roseata
Derbyan parakeet, Psittacula derbiana
Red-breasted parakeet, Psittacula alexandri
Vernal hanging-parrot, Loriculus vernalis

Asian and Grauer’s broadbills
Order: PasseriformesFamily: Eurylaimidae

The broadbills are small, brightly colored birds, which feed on fruit and also take insects in flycatcher fashion, snapping their broad bills. Their habitat is canopies of wet forests.

Long-tailed broadbill, Psarisomus dalhousiae
Silver-breasted broadbill, Serilophus lunatus

Pittas
Order: PasseriformesFamily: Pittidae

Pittas are medium-sized by passerine standards and are stocky, with fairly long, strong legs, short tails and stout bills. Many, but not all, are brightly colored. They spend the majority of their time on wet forest floors, eating snails, insects and similar invertebrates.

Eared pitta, Hydrornis phayrei
Rusty-naped pitta, Hydrornis oatesi
Blue-naped pitta, Hydrornis nipalensis
Blue-rumped pitta, Hydrornis soror
Blue pitta, Hydrornis cyanea
Indian pitta, Pitta brachyura
Blue-winged pitta, Pitta moluccensis
Fairy pitta, Pitta nympha
Hooded pitta, Pitta sordida

Cuckooshrikes
Order: PasseriformesFamily: Campephagidae

The cuckooshrikes are small to medium-sized passerine birds. They are predominantly grayish with white and black, although some species are brightly colored.

Gray-chinned minivet, Pericrocotus solaris
Short-billed minivet, Pericrocotus brevirostris
Long-tailed minivet, Pericrocotus ethologus
Scarlet minivet, Pericrocotus flammeus
Ryukyu minivet, Pericrocotus tegimae (A)
Ashy minivet, Pericrocotus divaricatus
Brown-rumped minivet, Pericrocotus cantonensis
Rosy minivet, Pericrocotus roseus
Large cuckooshrike, Coracina macei
Black-winged cuckooshrike, Coracina melaschistos

Vireos, shrike-babblers, and erpornis
Order: PasseriformesFamily: Vireonidae

Most of the members of this family are found in the New World. However, the shrike-babblers and erpornis, which only slightly resemble the "true" vireos and greenlets, are found in South East Asia.

Black-headed shrike-babbler, Pteruthius rufiventer
White-browed shrike-babbler, Pteruthius aeralatus
Green shrike-babbler, Pteruthius xanthochlorus
Black-eared shrike-babbler, Pteruthius melanotis
Clicking shrike-babbler, Pteruthius intermedius
White-bellied erpornis, Erpornis zantholeuca

Old World orioles
Order: PasseriformesFamily: Oriolidae

The Old World orioles are colorful passerine birds. They are not related to the New World orioles.

Eurasian golden oriole, Oriolus oriolus
Indian golden oriole, Oriolus kundoo
Black-naped oriole, Oriolus chinensis
Slender-billed oriole, Oriolus tenuirostris
Black-hooded oriole, Oriolus xanthornus
Maroon oriole, Oriolus traillii
Silver oriole, Oriolus mellianus

Woodswallows, bellmagpies, and allies
Order: PasseriformesFamily: Artamidae

The woodswallows are soft-plumaged, somber-colored passerine birds. They are smooth, agile flyers with moderately large, semi-triangular wings.

Ashy woodswallow, Artamus fuscus

Vangas, helmetshrikes, and allies
Order: PasseriformesFamily: Vangidae

The family Vangidae is highly variable, though most members of it resemble true shrikes to some degree.

Large woodshrike, Tephrodornis gularis
Common woodshrike, Tephrodornis pondicerianus
Bar-winged flycatcher-shrike, Hemipus picatus

Ioras
Order: PasseriformesFamily: Aegithinidae

The ioras are bulbul-like birds of open forest or thorn scrub, but whereas that group tends to be drab in coloration, ioras are sexually dimorphic, with the males being brightly plumaged in yellows and greens.

Common iora, Aegithina tiphia
Great iora, Aegithina lafresnayei

Fantails
Order: PasseriformesFamily: Rhipiduridae

The fantails are small insectivorous birds which are specialist aerial feeders.

White-throated fantail, Rhipidura albicollis
White-browed fantail, Rhipidura aureola

Drongos
Order: PasseriformesFamily: Dicruridae

The drongos are mostly black or dark gray in color, sometimes with metallic tints. They have long forked tails, and some Asian species have elaborate tail decorations. They have short legs and sit very upright when perched, like a shrike. They flycatch or take prey from the ground.

Black drongo, Dicrurus macrocercus
Ashy drongo, Dicrurus leucophaeus
Crow-billed drongo, Dicrurus annectens
Bronzed drongo, Dicrurus aeneus
Lesser racket-tailed drongo, Dicrurus remifer
Hair-crested drongo, Dicrurus hottentottus
Greater racket-tailed drongo, Dicrurus paradiseus

Monarch flycatchers
Order: PasseriformesFamily: Monarchidae

The monarch flycatchers are small to medium-sized insectivorous passerines which hunt by flycatching.

Black-naped monarch, Hypothymis azurea
Japanese paradise-flycatcher, Terpsiphone atrocaudata
Amur paradise-flycatcher, Terpsiphone incei
Blyth's paradise-flycatcher, Terpsiphone affinis
Indian paradise flycatcher, Terpsiphone paradisi

Shrikes
Order: PasseriformesFamily: Laniidae

Shrikes are passerine birds known for their habit of catching other birds and small animals and impaling the uneaten portions of their bodies on thorns. A typical shrike's beak is hooked, like a bird of prey.

Tiger shrike, Lanius tigrinus
Bull-headed shrike, Lanius bucephalus
Red-backed shrike, Lanius collurio
Red-tailed shrike, Lanius phoenicuroides
Isabelline shrike, Lanius isabellinus
Brown shrike, Lanius cristatus
Burmese shrike, Lanius collurioides
Long-tailed shrike, Lanius schach
Gray-backed shrike, Lanius tephronotus
Northern shrike, Lanius borealis
Great gray shrike, Lanius excubitor
Lesser gray shrike, Lanius minor
Chinese gray shrike, Lanius sphenocercus
Giant shrike, Lanius giganteus (E)

Crows, jays, and magpies

Order: PasseriformesFamily: Corvidae

The family Corvidae includes crows, ravens, jays, choughs, magpies, treepies, nutcrackers and ground jays. Corvids are above average in size among the Passeriformes, and some of the larger species show high levels of intelligence. China has the greatest diversity of corvids of any country.

Siberian jay, Perisoreus infaustus
Sichuan jay, Perisoreus internigrans (E)
Eurasian jay, Garrulus glandarius
Azure-winged magpie, Cyanopica cyana
Yellow-billed blue-magpie, Urocissa flavirostris
Red-billed blue-magpie, Urocissa erythrorhyncha
White-winged magpie, Urocissa whiteheadi
Common green-magpie, Cissa chinensis
Indochinese green-magpie, Cissa hypoleuca
Rufous treepie, Dendrocitta vagabunda
Gray treepie, Dendrocitta formosae
Collared treepie, Dendrocitta frontalis
Ratchet-tailed treepie, Temnurus temnurus
Black-rumped magpie, Pica bottanensis
Oriental magpie, Pica serica
Eurasian magpie, Pica pica
Mongolian ground-jay, Podoces hendersoni
Xinjiang ground-jay, Podoces biddulphi (E)
Eurasian nutcracker, Nucifraga caryocatactes
Red-billed chough, Pyrrhocorax pyrrhocorax
Yellow-billed chough, Pyrrhocorax graculus
Eurasian jackdaw, Corvus monedula
Daurian jackdaw, Corvus dauuricus
House crow, Corvus splendens
Rook, Corvus frugilegus
Carrion crow, Corvus corone
Hooded crow, Corvus cornix
Large-billed crow, Corvus macrorhynchos
Collared crow, Corvus torquatus
Common raven, Corvus corax

Fairy flycatchers
Order: PasseriformesFamily: Stenostiridae

Most of the species of this small family are found in Africa, though a few inhabit tropical Asia. They are not closely related to other birds called "flycatchers".

Yellow-bellied fairy-fantail, Chelidorhynx hypoxanthus
Gray-headed canary-flycatcher, Culicicapa ceylonensis

Tits, chickadees and titmice
Order: PasseriformesFamily: Paridae

The Paridae are mainly small stocky woodland species with short stout bills. Some have crests. They are adaptable birds, with a mixed diet including seeds and insects. China has the greatest diversity of tits of any country.

Fire-capped tit, Cephalopyrus flammiceps
Yellow-browed tit, Sylviparus modestus
Sultan tit, Melanochlora sultanea
Coal tit, Periparus ater
Rufous-naped tit, Periparus rufonuchalis
Rufous-vented tit, Periparus rubidiventris
Yellow-bellied tit, Periparus venustulus (E)
Gray-crested tit, Lophophanes dichrous
Varied tit, Sittiparus varius
White-browed tit, Poecile superciliosus (E)
Pere David's tit, Poecile davidi (E)
Marsh tit, Poecile palustris
Black-bibbed tit, Poecile hypermelaenus
Willow tit, Poecile montanus
Sichuan tit, Poecile weigoldicus
Gray-headed chickadee, Poecile cinctus (A)
Azure tit, Cyanistes cyanus
Ground tit, Pseudopodoces humilis
Green-backed tit, Parus monticolus
Great tit, Parus major
Cinereous tit, Parus cinereus
Japanese tit, Parus minor
Himalayan black-lored tit, Machlolophus xanthogenys (A)
Yellow-cheeked tit, Machlolophus spilonotus

Penduline-tits
Order: PasseriformesFamily: Remizidae

The penduline-tits are a group of small passerine birds related to the true tits. They are insectivores.

White-crowned penduline-tit, Remiz coronatus
Chinese penduline-tit, Remiz consobrinus

Larks
Order: PasseriformesFamily: Alaudidae

Larks are small terrestrial birds with often extravagant songs and display flights. Most larks are fairly dull in appearance. Their food is insects and seeds.

Horsfield’s bushlark, Mirafra javanica
Horned lark, Eremophila alpestris
Greater short-toed lark, Calandrella brachydactyla
Mongolian short-toed lark, Calandrella dukhunensis
Hume's lark, Calandrella acutirostris
Bimaculated lark, Melanocorypha bimaculata
Calandra lark, Melanocorypha calandra (A)
Tibetan lark, Melanocorypha maxima
Black lark, Melanocorypha yeltoniensis (A)
Mongolian lark, Melanocorypha mongolica
Asian short-toed lark, Alaudala cheleensis
Turkestan short-toed lark, Alaudala heinei (A)
White-winged lark, Alauda leucoptera (A)
Eurasian skylark, Alauda arvensis
Oriental skylark, Alauda gulgula
Crested lark, Galerida cristata

Bearded reedling
Order: PasseriformesFamily: Panuridae

This species, the only one in its family, is found in reed beds throughout temperate Europe and Asia.

Bearded reedling, Panurus biarmicus

Cisticolas and allies
Order: PasseriformesFamily: Cisticolidae

The Cisticolidae are warblers found mainly in warmer southern regions of the Old World. They are generally very small birds of drab brown or gray appearance found in open country such as grassland or scrub.

Common tailorbird, Orthotomus sutorius
Dark-necked tailorbird, Orthotomus atrogularis
Himalayan prinia, Prinia crinigera
Striped prinia, Prinia striata
Black-throated prinia, Prinia atrogularis
Hill prinia, Prinia superciliaris
Rufescent prinia, Prinia rufescens
Gray-breasted prinia, Prinia hodgsonii
Yellow-bellied prinia, Prinia flaviventris
Plain prinia, Prinia inornata
Zitting cisticola, Cisticola juncidis
Golden-headed cisticola, Cisticola exilis

Reed warblers and allies 
Order: PasseriformesFamily: Acrocephalidae

The members of this family are usually rather large for "warblers". Most are rather plain olivaceous brown above with much yellow to beige below. They are usually found in open woodland, reedbeds, or tall grass. The family occurs mostly in southern to western Eurasia and surroundings, but it also ranges far into the Pacific, with some species in Africa.
 

Thick-billed warbler, Arundinax aedon
Booted warbler, Iduna caligata
Sykes's warbler, Iduna rama
Eastern olivaceous warbler, Iduna pallida
Black-browed reed warbler, Acrocephalus bistrigiceps
Streaked reed warbler, Acrocephalus sorghophilus
Moustached warbler, Acrocephalus melanopogon (A)
Sedge warbler, Acrocephalus schoenobaenus
Paddyfield warbler, Acrocephalus agricola
Blunt-winged warbler, Acrocephalus concinens
Manchurian reed warbler, Acrocephalus tangorum
Blyth's reed warbler, Acrocephalus dumetorum
Eurasian reed warbler, Acrocephalus scirpaceus
Great reed warbler, Acrocephalus arundinaceus
Oriental reed warbler, Acrocephalus orientalis
Clamorous reed warbler, Acrocephalus stentoreus

Grassbirds and allies
Order: PasseriformesFamily: Locustellidae

Locustellidae are a family of small insectivorous songbirds found mainly in Eurasia, Africa, and the Australian region. They are smallish birds with tails that are usually long and pointed, and tend to be drab brownish or buffy all over.

Gray's grasshopper warbler, Helopsaltes fasciolatus
Marsh grassbird, Helopsaltes pryeri
Pallas's grasshopper warbler, Helopsaltes certhiola
Middendorff's grasshopper warbler, Helopsaltes ochotensis
Pleske's grasshopper warbler, Helopsaltes pleskei
Lanceolated warbler, Locustella lanceolata
Savi's warbler, Locustella luscinioides
Brown bush warbler, Locustella luteoventris
Common grasshopper-warbler, Locustella naevia
Long-billed bush warbler, Locustella major
Chinese bush warbler, Locustella tacsanowskia
Baikal bush warbler, Locustella davidi
Spotted bush warbler, Locustella thoracica
Russet bush warbler, Locustella mandelli
Sichuan bush warbler, Locustella chengi
Striated grassbird, Megalurus palustris

Cupwings
Order: PasseriformesFamily: Pnoepygidae

The members of this small family are found in mountainous parts of South and South East Asia.

Scaly-breasted cupwing, Pnoepyga albiventerImmaculate cupwing, Pnoepyga immaculata (A)
Pygmy cupwing, Pnoepyga pusillaSwallows
Order: PasseriformesFamily: Hirundinidae

The family Hirundinidae is adapted to aerial feeding. They have a slender streamlined body, long pointed wings and a short bill with a wide gape. The feet are adapted to perching rather than walking, and the front toes are partially joined at the base.

Gray-throated martin, Riparia chinensisBank swallow, Riparia ripariaPale sand martin, Riparia dilutaEurasian crag-martin, Ptyonoprogne rupestrisDusky crag-martin, Ptyonoprogne concolor (A)
Barn swallow, Hirundo rusticaWire-tailed swallow, Hirundo smithiiPacific swallow, Hirundo tahitica (A)
Red-rumped swallow, Cecropis dauricaStriated swallow, Cecropis striolataStreak-throated swallow, Petrochelidon fluvicola (A)
Common house-martin, Delichon urbicumAsian house-martin, Delichon dasypusNepal house-martin, Delichon nipalensisBulbuls

Order: PasseriformesFamily: Pycnonotidae

Bulbuls are medium-sized songbirds. Some are colorful with yellow, red or orange vents, cheeks, throats or supercilia, but most are drab, with uniform olive-brown to black plumage. Some species have distinct crests.

Black-headed bulbul, Brachypodius melanocephalosBlack-crested bulbul, Rubigula flaviventrisCrested finchbill, Spizixos canifronsCollared finchbill, Spizixos semitorquesStriated bulbul, Pycnonotus striatusRed-vented bulbul, Pycnonotus caferRed-whiskered bulbul, Pycnonotus jocosusBrown-breasted bulbul, Pycnonotus xanthorrhousLight-vented bulbul, Pycnonotus sinensisHimalayan bulbul, Pycnonotus leucogenys (A)
Sooty-headed bulbul, Pycnonotus aurigasterStripe-throated bulbul, Pycnonotus finlaysoniFlavescent bulbul, Pycnonotus flavescensWhite-throated bulbul, Alophoixus flaveolusPuff-throated bulbul, Alophoixus pallidusGray-eyed bulbul, Iole propinquaBlack bulbul, Hypsipetes leucocephalusBrown-eared bulbul, Hypsipetes amaurotisAshy bulbul, Hemixos flavalaChestnut bulbul, Hemixos castanonotusMountain bulbul, Ixos mcclellandiiLeaf warblers
Order: PasseriformesFamily: Phylloscopidae

Leaf warblers are a family of small insectivorous birds found mostly in Eurasia and ranging into Wallacea and Africa. The species are of various sizes, often green-plumaged above and yellow below, or more subdued with greyish-green to greyish-brown colors.

Wood warbler, Phylloscopus sibilatrix (A)
Ashy-throated warbler, Phylloscopus maculipennisBuff-barred warbler, Phylloscopus pulcherYellow-browed warbler, Phylloscopus inornatusHume's warbler, Phylloscopus humeiChinese leaf warbler, Phylloscopus yunnanensisPallas's leaf warbler, Phylloscopus proregulusGansu leaf-warbler, Phylloscopus kansuensis (E)
Lemon-rumped warbler, Phylloscopus chloronotusSichuan leaf warbler, Phylloscopus forrestiRadde's warbler, Phylloscopus schwarziYellow-streaked warbler, Phylloscopus armandiiSulphur-bellied warbler, Phylloscopus griseolusTickell's leaf warbler, Phylloscopus affinisDusky warbler, Phylloscopus fuscatusSmoky warbler, Phylloscopus fuligiventerBuff-throated warbler, Phylloscopus subaffinisWillow warbler, Phylloscopus trochilus (A)
Mountain chiffchaff, Phylloscopus sindianusCommon chiffchaff, Phylloscopus collybitaEastern crowned warbler, Phylloscopus coronatusWhite-spectacled warbler, Phylloscopus intermediusGray-cheeked warbler, Phylloscopus poliogenysGreen-crowned warbler, Phylloscopus burkiiGray-crowned warbler, Phylloscopus tephrocephalusWhistler's warbler, Phylloscopus whistleriBianchi's warbler, Phylloscopus valentiniMartens's warbler, Phylloscopus omeiensis (E)
Alström's warbler, Phylloscopus sororGreenish warbler, Phylloscopus trochiloidesTwo-barred warbler, Phylloscopus plumbeitarsusEmei leaf warbler, Phylloscopus emeiensis (E)
Large-billed leaf warbler, Phylloscopus magnirostrisPale-legged leaf warbler, Phylloscopus tenellipesSakhalin leaf warbler, Phylloscopus borealoides (A)
Japanese leaf warbler, Phylloscopus xanthodryasArctic warbler, Phylloscopus borealisKamchatka leaf warbler, Phylloscopus examinandusChestnut-crowned warbler, Phylloscopus castanicepsLimestone leaf warbler, Phylloscopus calciatilisYellow-vented warbler, Phylloscopus cantatorSulphur-breasted warbler, Phylloscopus rickettiBlyth's leaf warbler, Phylloscopus reguloidesClaudia's leaf warbler, Phylloscopus claudiae 
Hartert's leaf warbler, Phylloscopus goodsoni (E)
Gray-hooded warbler, Phylloscopus xanthoschistosDavison's leaf warbler, Phylloscopus intensiorHainan leaf warbler, Phylloscopus hainanus (E)
Kloss's leaf warbler, Phylloscopus ogilviegrantiBush warblers and allies
Order: PasseriformesFamily: Scotocercidae

The members of this family are found throughout Africa, Asia, and Polynesia. Their taxonomy is in flux, and some authorities place some genera in other families.

Pale-footed bush warbler, Urosphena pallidipes 
Asian stubtail, Urosphena squameicepsGray-bellied tesia, Tesia cyaniventerSlaty-bellied tesia, Tesia oliveaChestnut-crowned bush warbler, Cettia majorGray-sided bush warbler, Cettia brunnifronsChestnut-headed tesia, Cettia castaneocoronataCetti's warbler, Cettia cettiYellow-bellied warbler, Abroscopus superciliarisRufous-faced warbler, Abroscopus albogularisBlack-faced warbler, Abroscopus schisticepsMountain tailorbird, Phyllergates cuculatusBroad-billed warbler, Tickellia hodgsoniJapanese bush warbler, Horornis diphone (A)
Manchurian bush warbler, Horornis borealisBrownish-flanked bush warbler, Horornis fortipesHume's bush warbler, Horornis brunnescensYellowish-bellied bush warbler, Horornis acanthizoidesAberrant bush warbler, Horornis flavolivaceaLong-tailed tits
Order: PasseriformesFamily: Aegithalidae

Long-tailed tits are a group of small passerine birds with medium to long tails. They make woven bag nests in trees. Most eat a mixed diet which includes insects.

White-browed tit-warbler, Leptopoecile sophiaeCrested tit-warbler, Leptopoecile elegans (E)
Long-tailed tit, Aegithalos caudatusSilver-throated tit, Aegithalos glaucogularis (E)
Black-throated tit, Aegithalos concinnusBlack-browed tit, Aegithalos iouschistosSooty tit, Aegithalos fuliginosus (E)

Sylviid warblers, parrotbills, and allies
Order: PasseriformesFamily: Sylviidae

The family Sylviidae is a group of small insectivorous passerine birds. They mainly occur as breeding species, as the common name implies, in Europe, Asia and, to a lesser extent, Africa. Most are of generally undistinguished appearance, but many have distinctive songs.

Eurasian blackcap, Sylvia atricapilla (A)
Barred warbler, Curruca nisoriaLesser whitethroat, Curruca currucaAsian desert warbler, Curruca nanaGreater whitethroat, Curruca communisFire-tailed myzornis, Myzornis pyrrhouraRufous-tailed babbler, Moupinia poecilotis (E)
Golden-breasted fulvetta, Lioparus chrysotisYellow-eyed babbler, Chrysomma sinenseTarim babbler, Rhopophilus albosuperciliaris (E)
Beijing babbler, Rhopophilus pekinensisSpectacled fulvetta, Fulvetta ruficapilla 
Chinese fulvetta, Fulvetta striaticollis (E)
Brown-throated fulvetta, Fulvetta ludlowiWhite-browed fulvetta, Fulvetta vinipectusStreak-throated fulvetta, Fulvetta manipurensisGray-hooded fulvetta, Fulvetta cinereiceps 
Reed parrotbill, Calamornis heudeiSpot-breasted parrotbill, Paradoxornis guttaticollisGreat parrotbill, Conostoma aemodiumBrown parrotbill, Cholornis unicolorThree-toed parrotbill, Cholornis paradoxus (E)
Gray-headed parrotbill, Psittiparus gularisWhite-breasted parrotbill, Psittiparus ruficepsRufous-headed parrotbill, Psittiparus bakeriShort-tailed parrotbill, Neosuthora davidianusFulvous parrotbill, Suthora fulvifronsBlack-throated parrotbill, Suthora nipalensisGolden parrotbill, Suthora verreauxiPale-billed parrotbill, Chleuasicus atrosuperciliarisSpectacled parrotbill, Sinosuthora conspicillata (E)
Gray-hooded parrotbill, Sinosuthora zappeyi (E)
Brown-winged parrotbill, Sinosuthora brunneaVinous-throated parrotbill, Sinosuthora webbianaAshy-throated parrotbill, Sinosuthora alphonsianaRusty-throated parrotbill, Sinosuthora przewalskii (E)

White-eyes, yuhinas, and allies
Order: PasseriformesFamily: Zosteropidae

The white-eyes are small and mostly undistinguished, their plumage above being generally some dull color like greenish-olive, but some species have a white or bright yellow throat, breast or lower parts, and several have buff flanks. As their name suggests, many species have a white ring around each eye.

White-collared yuhina, Parayuhina diademataStriated yuhina, Staphida castanicepsIndochinese yuhina, Staphida torqueolaBlack-chinned yuhina, Yuhina nigrimentaWhiskered yuhina, Yuhina flavicollisWhite-naped yuhina, Yuhina bakeriStripe-throated yuhina, Yuhina gularisRufous-vented yuhina, Yuhina occipitalisChestnut-flanked white-eye, Zosterops erythropleurusSwinhoe's white-eye, Zosterops simplexWarbling white-eye, Zosterops japonicusIndian white-eye, Zosterops palpebrosusTree-babblers, scimitar-babblers, and allies
Order: PasseriformesFamily: Timaliidae

The babblers, or timaliids, are somewhat diverse in size and coloration, but are characterized by soft fluffy plumage.

Chestnut-capped babbler, Timalia pileataPin-striped tit-babbler, Macronus gularisGolden babbler, Cyanoderma chrysaeumBlack-chinned babbler, Cyanoderma pyrrhops (A)
Rufous-capped babbler, Cyanoderma ruficepsBuff-chested babbler, Cyanoderma ambiguumBar-winged wren-babbler, Spelaeornis troglodytoidesPale-throated wren-babbler, Spelaeornis kinneariGray-bellied wren-babbler, Spelaeornis reptatusCoral-billed scimitar-babbler, Pomatorhinus ferruginosusRed-billed scimitar-babbler, Pomatorhinus ochraceicepsSlender-billed scimitar-babbler, Pomatorhinus superciliarisStreak-breasted scimitar-babbler, Pomatorhinus ruficollisLarge scimitar-babbler, Erythrogenys hypoleucosRusty-cheeked scimitar-babbler, Erythrogenys erythrogenysBlack-streaked scimitar-babbler, Erythrogenys gravivoxGray-sided scimitar-babbler, Erythrogenys swinhoei 
Gray-throated babbler, Stachyris nigricepsNonggang babbler, Stachyris nonggangensis (E)
Sikkim wedge-billed babbler, Stachyris humei (A)
Cachar wedge-billed babbler, Stachyris robertiSpot-necked babbler, Stachyris striolataGround babblers and allies
Order: PasseriformesFamily: Pellorneidae

These small to medium-sized songbirds have soft fluffy plumage but are otherwise rather diverse. Members of the genus Illadopsis are found in forests, but some other genera are birds of scrublands.

Chinese grassbird, Graminicola striatusWhite-hooded babbler, Gampsorhynchus rufulusCollared babbler, Gampsorhynchus torquatusYellow-throated fulvetta, Schoeniparus cinereusRufous-winged fulvetta, Schoeniparus castanecepsGold-fronted fulvetta, Schoeniparus variegaticeps (E)
Rufous-throated fulvetta, Schoeniparus rufogularisRusty-capped fulvetta, Schoeniparus dubiusDusky fulvetta, Schoeniparus brunneusPuff-throated babbler, Pellorneum ruficepsSpot-throated babbler, Pellorneum albiventreBuff-breasted babbler, Pellorneum tickelliStreaked wren-babbler, Gypsophila brevicaudatusAnnam limestone babbler, Gypsophila annamensisEyebrowed wren-babbler, Napothera epilepidotaLong-billed wren-babbler, Napothera malacoptila 
Naung Mung scimitar-babbler, Napothera naungmungensis (A)

Laughingthrushes and allies

Order: PasseriformesFamily: Leiothrichidae

The members of this family are diverse in size and colouration, though those of genus Turdoides tend to be brown or greyish. The family is found in Africa, India, and southeast Asia.

Brown-cheeked fulvetta, Alcippe poioicephalaNepal fulvetta, Alcippe nipalensisDavid's fulvetta, Alcippe davidiHuet's fulvetta, Alcippe huetiYunnan fulvetta, Alcippe fraterculaStriated laughingthrush, Grammatoptila striataHimalayan cutia, Cutia nipalensisScaly laughingthrush, Trochalopteron subunicolorBlue-winged laughingthrush, Trochalopteron squamatumStreaked laughingthrush, Trochalopteron lineatumBhutan laughingthrush, Trochalopteron imbricatumVariegated laughingthrush, Trochalopteron variegatum (A)
Black-faced laughingthrush, Trochalopteron affinePrince Henry's laughingthrush, Trochalopteron henriciElliot's laughingthrush, Trochalopteron elliotii (E)
Red-tailed laughingthrush, Trochalopteron milneiChestnut-crowned laughingthrush, Trochalopteron erythrocephalumAssam laughingthrush, Trochalopteron chrysopterumRed-winged laughingthrush, Trochalopteron formosumSilver-eared laughingthrush, Trochalopteron melanostigmaLong-tailed sibia, Heterophasia picaoidesRufous sibia, Heterophasia capistrataBeautiful sibia, Heterophasia pulchellaGray sibia, Heterophasia gracilisBlack-backed sibia, Heterophasia melanoleucaBlack-headed sibia, Heterophasia desgodinsiHoary-throated barwing, Actinodura nipalensisStreak-throated barwing, Actinodura waldeniStreaked barwing, Actinodura soulieiBlue-winged minla, Actinodura cyanouropteraChestnut-tailed minla, Actinodura strigulaRusty-fronted barwing, Actinodura egertoniSpectacled barwing, Actinodura ramsayiRed-billed leiothrix, Leiothrix luteaSilver-eared mesia, Leiothrix argentaurisRed-tailed minla, Minla ignotinctaRufous-backed sibia, Leioptila annectensGray-faced liocichla, Liocichla omeiensis (E)
Red-faced liocichla, Liocichla phoeniceaScarlet-faced liocichla, Liocichla ripponiSpot-breasted laughingthrush, Garrulax merulinusChinese hwamei, Garrulax canorusLesser necklaced laughingthrush, Garrulax monilegerWhite-crested laughingthrush, Garrulax leucolophusWhite-necked laughingthrush, Garrulax strepitansGray laughingthrush, Garrulax maesiRufous-cheeked laughingthrush, Garrulax castanotisSnowy-cheeked laughingthrush, Ianthocincla sukatschewi (E)
Rufous-chinned laughingthrush, Ianthocincla rufogularis (A)
Moustached laughingthrush, Ianthocincla cineraceaSpotted laughingthrush, Ianthocincla ocellataGiant laughingthrush, Ianthocincla maxima (E)
Biet's laughingthrush, Ianthocincla bieti (E)
Barred laughingthrush, Ianthocincla lunulata (E)
Rufous-vented laughingthrush, Pterorhinus gularis (A)
Blue-crowned laughingthrush, Pterorhinus courtoisi (E)
Rufous-necked laughingthrush, Pterorhinus ruficollisBlack-throated laughingthrush, Pterorhinus chinensisWhite-browed laughingthrush, Pterorhinus sannioMasked laughingthrush, Pterorhinus perspicillatusGreater necklaced laughingthrush, Pterorhinus pectoralisPere David's laughingthrush, Pterorhinus davidi (E)
Chinese babax, Pterorhinus lanceolatusGiant babax, Pterorhinus waddelliTibetan babax, Pterorhinus koslowi (E)
White-throated laughingthrush, Pterorhinus albogularisGray-sided laughingthrush, Pterorhinus caerulatusBuffy laughingthrush, Pterorhinus berthemyi 

Kinglets
Order: PasseriformesFamily: Regulidae

The kinglets, also called crests, are a small group of birds often included in the Old World warblers, but frequently given family status because they also resemble the titmice.

Goldcrest, Regulus regulusWallcreeper
Order: PasseriformesFamily: Tichodromidae

The wallcreeper is a small bird, with stunning crimson, gray and black plumage, related to the nuthatch family.

Wallcreeper, Tichodroma murariaNuthatches
Order: PasseriformesFamily: Sittidae

Nuthatches are small woodland birds. They have the unusual ability to climb down trees head first, unlike other birds which can only go upwards. Nuthatches have big heads, short tails and powerful bills and feet. China has the greatest diversity of nuthatches of any country.

Chestnut-bellied nuthatch, Sitta castaneaBurmese nuthatch, Sitta neglectaEurasian nuthatch, Sitta europaeaChestnut-vented nuthatch, Sitta nagaensisWhite-tailed nuthatch, Sitta himalayensisPrzevalski's nuthatch, Sitta przewalskii (E)
Snowy-browed nuthatch, Sitta villosaYunnan nuthatch, Sitta yunnanensis (E)
Velvet-fronted nuthatch, Sitta frontalisYellow-billed nuthatch, Sitta solangiaeGiant nuthatch, Sitta magnaBeautiful nuthatch, Sitta formosaTreecreepers
Order: PasseriformesFamily: Certhiidae

Treecreepers are small woodland birds, brown above and white below. They have thin pointed down-curved bills, which they use to extricate insects from bark. They have stiff tail feathers, like woodpeckers, which they use to support themselves on vertical trees.

Eurasian treecreeper, Certhia familiarisHodgson's treecreeper, Certhia hodgsoniSichuan treecreeper, Certhia tianquanensis (E)
Bar-tailed treecreeper, Certhia himalayanaRusty-flanked treecreeper, Certhia nipalensisSikkim treecreeper, Certhia discolorHume's treecreeper, Certhia manipurensisWrens
Order: PasseriformesFamily: Troglodytidae

The wrens are mainly small and inconspicuous except for their loud songs. These birds have short wings and thin down-turned bills. Several species often hold their tails upright. All are insectivorous.

Eurasian wren, Troglodytes troglodytesSpotted elachura
Order: PasseriformesFamily: Elachuridae

This species, the only one in its family, inhabits forest undergrowth throughout South East Asia.

Spotted elachura, Elachura formosaDippers
Order: PasseriformesFamily: Cinclidae

Dippers are a group of perching birds whose habitat includes aquatic environments in the Americas, Europe and Asia. They are named for their bobbing or dipping movements.

White-throated dipper, Cinclus cinclusBrown dipper, Cinclus pallasiiStarlings
Order: PasseriformesFamily: Sturnidae

Starlings are small to medium-sized passerine birds. Their flight is strong and direct and they are very gregarious. Their preferred habitat is fairly open country. They eat insects and fruit. Plumage is typically dark with a metallic sheen.

Asian glossy starling, Aplonis panayensis (A)
Golden-crested myna, Ampeliceps coronatusCommon hill myna, Gracula religiosaEuropean starling, Sturnus vulgarisRosy starling, Pastor roseusDaurian starling, Agropsar sturninusChestnut-cheeked starling, Agropsar philippensisBlack-collared starling, Gracupica nigricollisIndian pied starling, Gracupica contraSiamese pied starling, Gracupica floweriWhite-shouldered starling, Sturnia sinensisBrahminy starling, Sturnia pagodarum (A)
Chestnut-tailed starling, Sturnia malabaricaRed-billed starling, Spodiopsar sericeusWhite-cheeked starling, Spodiopsar cineraceusCommon myna, Acridotheres tristisBank myna, Acridotheres ginginianus (A)
Burmese myna, Acridotheres burmannicusJavan myna, Acridotheres javanicus (I)
Collared myna, Acridotheres albocinctusGreat myna, Acridotheres grandisCrested myna, Acridotheres cristatellusSpot-winged starling, Saroglossa spilopterus (A)

Thrushes and allies
Order: PasseriformesFamily: Turdidae

The thrushes are a group of passerine birds that occur mainly in the Old World. They are plump, soft plumaged, small to medium-sized insectivores or sometimes omnivores, often feeding on the ground. Many have attractive songs.

Grandala, Grandala coelicolorLong-tailed thrush, Zoothera dixoniAlpine thrush, Zoothera mollissimaHimalayan thrush, Zoothera salimaliiSichuan thrush, Zoothera griseicepsDark-sided thrush, Zoothera marginataLong-billed thrush, Zoothera monticola (A)
White's thrush, Zoothera aureaScaly thrush, Zoothera daumaPurple cochoa, Cochoa purpureaGreen cochoa, Cochoa viridisSiberian thrush, Geokichla sibiricaOrange-headed thrush, Geokichla citrinaChinese thrush, Otocichla mupinensisMistle thrush, Turdus viscivorusSong thrush, Turdus philomelosRedwing, Turdus iliacusEurasian blackbird, Turdus merula 
Chinese blackbird, Turdus mandarinusGray-winged blackbird, Turdus boulboulJapanese thrush, Turdus cardisGray-backed thrush, Turdus hortulorumTickell's thrush, Turdus unicolorBlack-breasted thrush, Turdus dissimilisGray-sided thrush, Turdus feaeEyebrowed thrush, Turdus obscurusBrown-headed thrush, Turdus chrysolausPale thrush, Turdus pallidusWhite-backed thrush, Turdus kessleriTibetan blackbird, Turdus maximusFieldfare, Turdus pilarisWhite-collared blackbird, Turdus albocinctusChestnut thrush, Turdus rubrocanusBlack-throated thrush, Turdus atrogularisRed-throated thrush, Turdus ruficollisDusky thrush, Turdus eunomusNaumann's thrush, Turdus naumanniOld World flycatchers
Order: PasseriformesFamily: Muscicapidae

Old World flycatchers are a large group of small passerine birds native to the Old World. They are mainly small arboreal insectivores. The appearance of these birds is highly varied, but they mostly have weak songs and harsh calls.

Gray-streaked flycatcher, Muscicapa griseistictaDark-sided flycatcher, Muscicapa sibiricaFerruginous flycatcher, Muscicapa ferrugineaAsian brown flycatcher, Muscicapa dauuricaBrown-breasted flycatcher, Muscicapa muttuiSpotted flycatcher, Muscicapa striataRufous-tailed scrub-robin, Cercotrichas galactotesOriental magpie-robin, Copsychus saularisWhite-rumped shama, Copsychus malabaricusWhite-gorgeted flycatcher, Anthipes monilegerWhite-tailed flycatcher, Cyornis concretusHainan blue flycatcher, Cyornis hainanusPale-chinned blue flycatcher, Cyornis poliogenysPale blue flycatcher, Cyornis unicolorBlue-throated flycatcher, Cyornis rubeculoidesChinese blue flycatcher, Cyornis glaucicomansHill blue flycatcher, Cyornis whiteiTickell's blue flycatcher, Cyornis tickelliaeBrown-chested jungle-flycatcher, Cyornis brunneatusLarge niltava, Niltava grandisSmall niltava, Niltava macgrigoriaeFujian niltava, Niltava davidiRufous-bellied niltava, Niltava sundaraChinese vivid niltava, Niltava oatesi (E)
Blue-and-white flycatcher, Cyanoptila cyanomelanaZappey's flycatcher, Cyanoptila cumatilisVerditer flycatcher, Eumyias thalassinaEuropean robin, Erithacus rubeculaRusty-bellied shortwing, Brachypteryx hyperythraGould's shortwing, Brachypteryx stellataLesser shortwing, Brachypteryx leucophrysHimalayan shortwing, Brachypteryx cruralisChinese shortwing, Brachypteryx sinensis (E)
Rufous-tailed robin, Larvivora sibilansRufous-headed robin, Larvivora ruficepsJapanese robin, Larvivora akahigeRyukyu robin, Larvivora komadoriIndian blue robin, Larvivora brunneaSiberian blue robin, Larvivora cyaneCommon nightingale, Luscinia megarhynchosWhite-bellied redstart, Luscinia phoenicuroidesBluethroat, Luscinia svecicaBlue whistling-thrush, Myophonus caeruleusLittle forktail, Enicurus scouleriWhite-crowned forktail, Enicurus leschenaultiSpotted forktail, Enicurus maculatusBlack-backed forktail, Enicurus immaculatusSlaty-backed forktail, Enicurus schistaceusFirethroat, Calliope pectardensBlackthroat, Calliope obscuraSiberian rubythroat, Calliope calliopeHimalayan rubythroat, Calliope pectoralisChinese rubythroat, Calliope tschebaiewiWhite-tailed robin, Myiomela leucuraBlue-fronted robin, Cinclidium frontaleRed-flanked bluetail, Tarsiger cyanurusHimalayan bluetail, Tarsiger rufilatusRufous-breasted bush-robin, Tarsiger hyperythrusWhite-browed bush-robin, Tarsiger indicusGolden bush-robin, Tarsiger chrysaeusYellow-rumped flycatcher, Ficedula zanthopygiaGreen-backed flycatcher, Ficedula elisaeNarcissus flycatcher, Ficedula narcissinaRyukyu flycatcher, Ficedula owstoniMugimaki flycatcher, Ficedula mugimakiSlaty-backed flycatcher, Ficedula hodgsoniiSlaty-blue flycatcher, Ficedula tricolorSnowy-browed flycatcher, Ficedula hyperythraPygmy flycatcher, Ficedula hodgsoniRufous-gorgeted flycatcher, Ficedula strophiataSapphire flycatcher, Ficedula sapphiraLittle pied flycatcher, Ficedula westermanniUltramarine flycatcher, Ficedula superciliarisTaiga flycatcher, Ficedula albicillaRed-breasted flycatcher, Ficedula parva (A)
European pied flycatcher, Ficedula hypoleuca (A)
Blue-fronted redstart, Phoenicurus frontalisPlumbeous redstart, Phoenicurus fuliginosusRufous-backed redstart, Phoenicurus erythronotaWhite-capped redstart, Phoenicurus leucocephalusAla Shan redstart, Phoenicurus alaschanicus (E)
Blue-capped redstart, Phoenicurus caeruleocephalusCommon redstart, Phoenicurus phoenicurusHodgson's redstart, Phoenicurus hodgsoniWhite-throated redstart, Phoenicurus schisticepsWhite-winged redstart, Phoenicurus erythrogasterBlack redstart, Phoenicurus ochrurosDaurian redstart, Phoenicurus auroreusChestnut-bellied rock-thrush, Monticola rufiventrisWhite-throated rock-thrush, Monticola gularisRufous-tailed rock-thrush, Monticola saxatilisBlue rock-thrush, Monticola solitariusWhite-throated bushchat, Saxicola insignisSiberian stonechat, Saxicola maurusAmur stonechat, Saxicola stejnegeriPied bushchat, Saxicola caprata 
Jerdon's bushchat, Saxicola jerdoni 
Gray bushchat, Saxicola ferreusNorthern wheatear, Oenanthe oenantheIsabelline wheatear, Oenanthe isabellinaDesert wheatear, Oenanthe desertiEastern black-eared wheatear, Oenanthe melanoleuca (A)
Pied wheatear, Oenanthe pleschankaVariable wheatear, Oenanthe picataWaxwings
Order: PasseriformesFamily: Bombycillidae

The waxwings are a group of birds with soft silky plumage and unique red tips to some of the wing feathers. In the Bohemian and cedar waxwings, these tips look like sealing wax and give the group its name. These are arboreal birds of northern forests. They live on insects in summer and berries in winter.

Bohemian waxwing, Bombycilla garrulusJapanese waxwing, Bombycilla japonicaFlowerpeckers
Order: PasseriformesFamily: Dicaeidae

The flowerpeckers are very small, stout, often brightly colored birds, with short tails, short thick curved bills and tubular tongues.

Thick-billed flowerpecker, Dicaeum agileYellow-vented flowerpecker, Dicaeum chrysorrheumYellow-bellied flowerpecker, Dicaeum melanozanthumPlain flowerpecker, Dicaeum minullumFire-breasted flowerpecker, Dicaeum ignipectusScarlet-backed flowerpecker, Dicaeum cruentatumSunbirds and spiderhunters
Order: PasseriformesFamily: Nectariniidae

The sunbirds and spiderhunters are very small passerine birds which feed largely on nectar, although they will also take insects, especially when feeding young. Flight is fast and direct on their short wings. Most species can take nectar by hovering like a hummingbird, but usually perch to feed.

Ruby-cheeked sunbird, Chalcoparia singalensisBrown-throated sunbird, Anthreptes malacensis (A)
Purple sunbird, Cinnyris asiaticusOlive-backed sunbird, Cinnyris jugularisFire-tailed sunbird, Aethopyga ignicaudaBlack-throated sunbird, Aethopyga saturataMrs. Gould's sunbird, Aethopyga gouldiaeGreen-tailed sunbird, Aethopyga nipalensisCrimson sunbird, Aethopyga siparajaFork-tailed sunbird, Aethopyga christinaePurple-naped sunbird, Hypogramma hypogrammicumLittle spiderhunter, Arachnothera longirostraStreaked spiderhunter, Arachnothera magnaFairy-bluebirds
Order: PasseriformesFamily: Irenidae

The fairy-bluebirds are bulbul-like birds of open forest or thorn scrub. The males are dark-blue and the females a duller green.

Asian fairy-bluebird, Irena puellaLeafbirds
Order: PasseriformesFamily: Chloropseidae

The leafbirds are small, bulbul-like birds. The males are brightly plumaged, usually in greens and yellows.

Blue-winged leafbird, Chloropsis cochinchinensisGolden-fronted leafbird, Chloropsis aurifronsOrange-bellied leafbird, Chloropsis hardwickiiPinktails
Order: PasseriformesFamily: Urocynchramidae

Przevalski's pinktail  is an unusual passerine bird endemic to the mountains of central-west China.

Przevalski's pinktail, Urocynchramus pylzowi (E)

Weavers and allies
Order: PasseriformesFamily: Ploceidae

The weavers are small passerine birds related to the finches. They are seed-eating birds with rounded conical bills. The males of many species are brightly colored, usually in red or yellow and black, some species show variation in color only in the breeding season.

Streaked weaver, Ploceus manyarBaya weaver, Ploceus philippinusWaxbills and allies
Order: PasseriformesFamily: Estrildidae

The estrildid finches are small passerine birds of the Old World tropics and Australasia. They are gregarious and often colonial seed eaters with short thick but pointed bills. They are all similar in structure and habits, but have a wide variation in plumage colors and patterns.

Java sparrow, Padda oryzivora (I)
Scaly-breasted munia, Lonchura punctulataWhite-rumped munia, Lonchura striataChestnut munia, Lonchura atricapillaPin-tailed parrotfinch, Erythrura prasina (A)
Red avadavat, Amandava amandavaAccentors
Order: PasseriformesFamily: Prunellidae

The accentors are in the only bird family, Prunellidae, which is completely endemic to the Palearctic. They are small, fairly drab species superficially similar to sparrows.

Alpine accentor, Prunella collarisAltai accentor, Prunella himalayanaRobin accentor, Prunella rubeculoidesRufous-breasted accentor, Prunella strophiataSiberian accentor, Prunella montanellaBrown accentor, Prunella fulvescensBlack-throated accentor, Prunella atrogularisMongolian accentor, Prunella koslowiMaroon-backed accentor, Prunella immaculataOld World sparrows
Order: PasseriformesFamily: Passeridae

Old World sparrows are small passerine birds. In general, sparrows tend to be small, plump, brown or gray birds with short tails and short powerful beaks. Sparrows are seed eaters, but they also consume small insects.

Saxaul sparrow, Passer ammodendriHouse sparrow, Passer domesticusSpanish sparrow, Passer hispaniolensisRusset sparrow, Passer cinnamomeusEurasian tree sparrow, Passer montanusRock sparrow, Petronia petroniaWhite-winged snowfinch, Montifringilla nivalisTibetan snowfinch, Montifringilla henriciBlack-winged snowfinch, Montifringilla adamsiWhite-rumped snowfinch, Montifringilla taczanowskiiPere David's snowfinch, Montifringilla davidianaRufous-necked snowfinch, Montifringilla ruficollisBlanford's snowfinch, Montifringilla blanfordiWagtails and pipits
Order: PasseriformesFamily: Motacillidae

Motacillidae is a family of small passerine birds with medium to long tails. They include the wagtails, longclaws and pipits. They are slender, ground feeding insectivores of open country.

Forest wagtail, Dendronanthus indicusGray wagtail, Motacilla cinereaWestern yellow wagtail, Motacilla flavaEastern yellow wagtail, Motacilla tschutschensisCitrine wagtail, Motacilla citreolaWhite-browed wagtail, Motacilla maderaspatensis (A)
Japanese wagtail, Motacilla grandis (A)
White wagtail, Motacilla albaRichard's pipit, Anthus richardiPaddyfield pipit, Anthus rufulusBlyth's pipit, Anthus godlewskiiTawny pipit, Anthus campestrisUpland pipit, Anthus sylvanusMeadow pipit, Anthus pratensisRosy pipit, Anthus roseatusTree pipit, Anthus trivialisOlive-backed pipit, Anthus hodgsoniPechora pipit, Anthus gustaviRed-throated pipit, Anthus cervinusWater pipit, Anthus spinolettaAmerican pipit, Anthus rubescensFinches, euphonias, and allies
Order: PasseriformesFamily: Fringillidae

Finches are seed-eating passerine birds, that are small to moderately large and have a strong beak, usually conical and in some species very large. All have twelve tail feathers and nine primaries. These birds have a bouncing flight with alternating bouts of flapping and gliding on closed wings, and most sing well. China has the greatest diversity of finches of any country.

Common chaffinch, Fringilla coelebsBrambling, Fringilla montifringillaCollared grosbeak, Mycerobas affinisSpot-winged grosbeak, Mycerobas melanozanthosWhite-winged grosbeak, Mycerobas carnipesHawfinch, Coccothraustes coccothraustesYellow-billed grosbeak, Eophona migratoriaJapanese grosbeak, Eophona personataCommon rosefinch, Carpodacus erythrinusScarlet finch, Carpodacus sipahiRed-mantled rosefinch, Carpodacus rhodochlamysBlyth's rosefinch, Carpodacus grandisHimalayan beautiful rosefinch, Carpodacus pulcherrimusChinese beautiful rosefinch, Carpodacus davidianusPink-rumped rosefinch, Carpodacus waltoniDark-rumped rosefinch, Carpodacus edwardsii 
Pink-browed rosefinch, Carpodacus rhodochrousSpot-winged rosefinch, Carpodacus rhodopeplusSharpe's rosefinch, Carpodacus verreauxiiVinaceous rosefinch, Carpodacus vinaceusPale rosefinch, Carpodacus stoliczkaeTibetan rosefinch, Carpodacus roborowskii (E)
Sillem's rosefinch, Carpodacus sillemi (E)
Streaked rosefinch, Carpodacus rubicilloidesGreat rosefinch, Carpodacus rubicillaLong-tailed rosefinch, Carpodacus sibiricusRed-fronted rosefinch, Carpodacus puniceusCrimson-browed finch, Carpodacus subhimachalusPallas's rosefinch, Carpodacus roseusThree-banded rosefinch, Carpodacus trifasciatusHimalayan white-browed rosefinch, Carpodacus thuraChinese white-browed rosefinch, Carpodacus dubiusPine grosbeak, Pinicola enucleatorBrown bullfinch, Pyrrhula nipalensisRed-headed bullfinch, Pyrrhula erythrocephalaGray-headed bullfinch, Pyrrhula erythacaEurasian bullfinch, Pyrrhula pyrrhulaCrimson-winged finch, Rhodopechys sanguineusMongolian finch, Bucanetes mongolicusBlanford's rosefinch, Agraphospiza rubescensGold-naped finch, Pyrrhoplectes epaulettaDark-breasted rosefinch, Procarduelis nipalensisPlain mountain finch, Leucosticte nemoricolaBlack-headed mountain finch, Leucosticte brandtiAsian rosy-finch, Leucosticte arctoaDesert finch, Rhodospiza obsoletaEuropean greenfinch, Chloris chlorisOriental greenfinch, Chloris sinicaYellow-breasted greenfinch, Chloris spinoidesBlack-headed greenfinch, Chloris ambiguaTwite, Linaria flavirostrisEurasian linnet, Linaria cannabinaCommon redpoll, Acanthis flammeaHoary redpoll, Acanthis hornemanniRed crossbill, Loxia curvirostraWhite-winged crossbill, Loxia leucopteraEuropean goldfinch, Carduelis carduelisFire-fronted serin, Serinus pusillusTibetan serin, Spinus thibetanusEurasian siskin, Spinus spinusLongspurs and snow buntings
Order: PasseriformesFamily: Calcariidae

The Calcariidae are a group of passerine birds which had been traditionally grouped with the New World sparrows, but differ in a number of respects and are usually found in open grassy areas.

Lapland longspur, Calcarius lapponicusSnow bunting, Plectrophenax nivalisOld World buntings
Order: PasseriformesFamily: Emberizidae

The emberizids are a large family of passerine birds. They are seed-eating birds with distinctively shaped bills. Many emberizid species have distinctive head patterns.

Crested bunting, Emberiza lathamiBlack-headed bunting, Emberiza melanocephala (A)
Red-headed bunting, Emberiza brunicepsCorn bunting, Emberiza calandraChestnut-eared bunting, Emberiza fucataTibetan bunting, Emberiza koslowi (E)
Rufous-backed bunting, Emberiza jankowskiiRock bunting, Emberiza ciaGodlewski's bunting, Emberiza godlewskiiMeadow bunting, Emberiza cioidesWhite-capped bunting, Emberiza stewarti (A) 
Yellowhammer, Emberiza citrinellaPine bunting, Emberiza leucocephalosGray-necked bunting, Emberiza buchananiOrtolan bunting, Emberiza hortulanaSlaty bunting, Emberiza siemsseni (E)
Yellow-throated bunting, Emberiza elegansOchre-rumped bunting, Emberiza yessoensisPallas's bunting, Emberiza pallasiReed bunting, Emberiza schoeniclusYellow-breasted bunting, Emberiza aureolaLittle bunting, Emberiza pusillaRustic bunting, Emberiza rusticaYellow bunting, Emberiza sulphurataBlack-faced bunting, Emberiza spodocephalaChestnut bunting, Emberiza rutilaYellow-browed bunting, Emberiza chrysophrysTristram's bunting, Emberiza tristramiGray bunting, Emberiza variabilis (A)

New World sparrows
Order: PasseriformesFamily: Passerellidae

Until 2017, these species were considered part of the family Emberizidae. Most of the species are known as sparrows, but these birds are not closely related to the Old World sparrows which are in the family Passeridae. Many of these have distinctive head patterns.

White-crowned sparrow, Zonotrichia leucophrys'' (A)

See also
List of birds
Lists of birds by region
List of endangered and protected species of China

Notes

References

China
'